Neoascia monticola is a species of hoverfly in the family Syrphidae.

Distribution
Armenia.

References

Eristalinae
Insects described in 1960
Diptera of Asia
Taxa named by Aleksandr Stackelberg